The Cayos de Caña Gorda ( or Cays) is a group of three uninhabited, mangrove-covered keys, located at  off the southwestern coast of Puerto Rico. They belong to barrio Carenero of Guánica municipio. The western key was given the name  Gilligan's Island (after the TV series) in the 1970s by the Keegan/Barnett family, who had recently moved to Guanica from Philadelphia, Pennsylvania. Cayo Aurora is served by boat ( from the mainland at Punta Jacinto) and has public beaches. Between the two is Cayo Honda, the central key.

The area is good for snorkeling and can be reached by kayak.

Gallery

References

Cays and islets of Puerto Rico
Cayos Cano Gorda
Guánica, Puerto Rico